The 1972 Kentucky Wildcats football team represented the University of Kentucky in the Southeastern Conference during the 1972 NCAA University Division football season.

Schedule

References

Kentucky
Kentucky Wildcats football seasons
Kentucky Wildcats football